This article contains a list of bees of Great Britain. The following species are all within the superfamily Apoidea.

Family Colletidae

Genus Colletes: plasterer bees 
 Colletes cunicularius, vernal colletes bee or spring mining-bee
 Colletes daviesanus, Davies' colletes bee; Common in England, scarce in Scotland and Ireland
 Colletes floralis, northern colletes bee
 Colletes fodiens, hairy-saddled colletes bee; Widespread on sandy habitats in England, Wales and southern Scotland
 Colletes halophilus, sea aster bee
 Colletes hederae, ivy bee; Southern, generally coastal distribution
 Colletes marginatus, little colletes bee; Localised to sand dunes on coasts of England and Wales. Inland population in the Brecks.
 Colletes similis, common plasterer bee; Widespread in southern Britain and Ireland
 Colletes succinctus, heather colletes bee; Widespread throughout the Britain and Ireland on heathland and moorland

Genus Hylaeus: yellow-face bees 
 Hylaeus annularis, shingle yellow-face bee; Widespread, locally common syn. Hylaeus spilotus
 Hylaeus brevicornis, short-horned yellow-face bee
 Hylaeus communis, common yellow-face bee
 Hylaeus confusus, white-jawed yellow-face bee
 Hylaeus cornutus, spined hylaeus bee
 Hylaeus dilatatus, chalk yellow-face bee
 Hylaeus hyalinatus, hairy yellow-face bee
 Hylaeus incongruus, white-lipped yellow-face bee; syn. Hylaeus gibbus
 Hylaeus pectoralis, reed yellow-face bee
 Hylaeus pictipes, little yellow-face bee
 Hylaeus punctulatissimus, onion yellow-face bee
 Hylaeus signatus, large yellow-face bee

Family Andrenidae

Genus Andrena: mining bees 
 Andrena agilissima, violet-winged mining bee
 Andrena angustior, groove-faced mining bee
 Andrena apicata, large sallow mining bee
 Andrena argentata, small sandpit mining bee
 Andrena barbilabris, sandpit mining bee
 Andrena bicolor, Gwynne's mining bee
 Andrena bimaculata, large gorse mining bee
 Andrena bucephala, large-headed mining bee
 Andrena chrysosceles, hawthorn mining bee
 Andrena cineraria, ashy mining bee
 Andrena clarkella, Clarke's mining bee
 Andrena coitana, small-flecked mining bee
 Andrena congruens, long-fringed mining bee
 Andrena denticulata, grey-banded mining bee
 Andrena dorsata, short-fringed mining bee
 Andrena ferox, oak mining bee
 Andrena flavipes, yellow-legged mining bee
 Andrena florea, bryony mining bee
 Andrena fucata, painted mining bee
 Andrena fulva, tawny mining bee
 Andrena fulvago, hawksbeard mining bee
 Andrena fuscipes, heather mining bee
 Andrena gravida, white-bellied mining bee
 Andrena haemorrhoa, orange-tailed mining bee
 Andrena hattorfiana, large scabious mining bee
 Andrena helvola, coppice mining bee
 Andrena humilis, catsear mining bee
 Andrena labialis, large meadow mining bee
 Andrena labiata, red-girdled mining bee
 Andrena lapponica, bilberry mining bee
 Andrena lathyri, Burbage mining bee
 Andrena lepida, Aldworth mining bee
 Andrena marginata, small scabious mining bee
 Andrena nigriceps, black-headed mining bee
 Andrena nigroaenea, buffish mining bee
 Andrena nigrospina, scarce black mining bee
 Andrena nitida, grey-patched mining bee
 Andrena nitidiuscula, carrot mining bee
 Andrena ovatula, small gorse mining bee
 Andrena pilipes, black mining bee
 Andrena polita, Maidstone mining bee
 Andrena praecox, small sallow mining bee
 Andrena proxima, broad-faced mining bee
 Andrena rosae, Perkins' mining bee
 Andrena ruficrus, northern mining bee
 Andrena scotica, chocolate mining bee
 Andrena similis, red-backed mining bee
 Andrena simillima, buff-banded mining bee
 Andrena synadelpha, broad-margined mining bee
 Andrena tarsata, tormentil mining bee
 Andrena thoracica, cliff mining bee
 Andrena tibialis, grey-gastered mining bee
 Andrena tridentata, pale-tailed mining bee
 Andrena trimmerana, Trimmer's mining bee
 Andrena vaga, Grey-backed mining bee
 Andrena varians, blackthorn mining bee
 Andrena wilkella, Wilke's mining bee

Subgenus Micrandrena: mini-miners 

 Andrena alfkenella, Alfken's miniature mining bee
 Andrena falsifica, thick-margined miniature mining bee
 Andrena floricola, Chilterns miniature mining bee
 Andrena minutula, common miniature mining bee
 Andrena minutuloides, plain miniature mining bee
 Andrena nana, Barham miniature mining bee
 Andrena nanula, red-horned miniature mining bee
 Andrena niveata, long-fringed miniature mining bee
 Andrena semilaevis, shiny-margined miniature mining bee
 Andrena subopaca, impunctate miniature mining bee

Genus Panurgus: shaggy bees 
 Panurgus banksianus, large shaggy bee
 Panurgus calcaratus, small shaggy bee

Family Halictidae

Genus Halictus: end-banded furrow bees 
 Halictus confusus, southern bronze furrow bee
 Halictus eurygnathus, downland furrow bee
 Halictus maculatus, square-headed furrow bee
 Halictus quadricinctus, giant furrow bee
 Halictus rubicundus, orange-legged furrow bee
 Halictus scabiosae, great-banded furrow bee
 Halictus subauratus, golden furrow bee
 Halictus tumulorum, bronze furrow bee

Genus Lasioglossum: base-banded furrow bees 
 Lasioglossum albipes, bloomed furrow bee
 Lasioglossum angusticeps, cliff furrow bee
 Lasioglossum brevicorne, short-horned furrow bee
 Lasioglossum calceatum, common furrow bee
 Lasioglossum cupromicans, turquoise furrow bee
 Lasioglossum fratellum, smooth-faced furrow bee
 Lasioglossum fulvicorne, lime-loving furrow bee
 Lasioglossum laeve, shiny-gastered furrow bee
 Lasioglossum laevigatum, black-mouthed furrow bee
 Lasioglossum laticeps, broad-faced furrow bee
 Lasioglossum lativentre, furry-claspered furrow bee
 Lasioglossum leucopus, white-footed green furrow bee
 Lasioglossum leucozonium, white-zoned furrow bee
 Lasioglossum limbellum, ridge-gastered furrow bee
 Lasioglossum malachurum, sharp-collared furrow bee
 Lasioglossum minutissimum, least furrow bee
 Lasioglossum morio, common green furrow bee
 Lasioglossum nitidiusculum, tufted furrow bee
 Lasioglossum parvulum, smooth-gastered furrow bee
 Lasioglossum pauperatum, squat furrow bee
 Lasioglossum pauxillum, lobe-spurred furrow bee
 Lasioglossum prasinum, grey-tailed furrow bee
 Lasioglossum punctatissimum, long-faced furrow bee
 Lasioglossum puncticolle, ridge-cheeked furrow bee
 Lasioglossum quadrinotatum, four-spotted furrow bee
 Lasioglossum rufitarse, rufous-footed furrow bee
 Lasioglossum semilucens, small shiny furrow bee
 Lasioglossum sexnotatum, ashy furrow bee
 Lasioglossum smeathmanellum, Smeathman's furrow bee
 Lasioglossum villosulum, orange-footed furrow bee
 Lasioglossum xanthopus, shaggy furrow bee
 Lasioglossum zonulus, bull-headed furrow bee

Genus Sphecodes: blood bees 
 Sphecodes albilabris, giant blood bee
 Sphecodes crassus, swollen-thighed blood bee
 Sphecodes ephippius, bare-saddled blood bee
 Sphecodes ferruginatus, dull-headed blood bee
 Sphecodes geoffrellus, Geoffroy's blood bee
 Sphecodes gibbus, dark-winged blood bee
 Sphecodes hyalinatus, furry-bellied blood bee
 Sphecodes longulus, little sickle-jawed blood bee
 Sphecodes marginatus, margined blood bee
 Sphecodes miniatus, false-margined blood bee
 Sphecodes monilicornis, box-headed blood bee
 Sphecodes niger, dark blood bee
 Sphecodes pellucidus, sandpit blood bee
 Sphecodes puncticeps, sickle-jawed blood bee
 Sphecodes reticulatus, reticulate blood bee
 Sphecodes rubicundus, red-tailed blood bee
 Sphecodes scabricollis, rough-backed blood bee
 Sphecodes spinulosus, spined blood bee

Genus Dufourea: short-faced bees 
 Dufourea halictula, sheep's bit short-faced bee
 Dufourea minuta, shiny short-faced bee

Genus Rophites: bristle-headed bees 
 Rophites quinquespinosus, five-spined bee

Family Melittidae

Genus Dasypoda: pantaloon bees 
 Dasypoda hirtipes, pantaloon bee

Genus Melitta: blunthorn bees 
 Melitta dimidiata, sainfoin blunthorn bee
 Melitta haemorrhoidalis, bellflower blunthorn bee
 Melitta leporina, clover blunthorn bee
 Melitta tricincta, red bartsia blunthorn bee

Genus Macropis: loosestrife bees 
 Macropis europaea, yellow loosestrife bee

Family Megachilidae

Genus Anthidium: wool carder bees 
 Anthidium manicatum, European wool carder bee

Genus Stelis: dark bees 
 Stelis breviuscula, little dark bee
 Stelis ornatula, spotted dark bee
 Stelis phaeoptera, plain dark bee
 Stelis punctulatissima, banded dark bee

Genus Heriades: resin bees 
 Heriades truncorum, ridge-saddled carpenter bee

Genus Chelostoma: scissor bees 
 Chelostoma campanularum, small scissor bee
 Chelostoma florisomne, large scissor bee

Genus Osmia: mason bees 
 Osmia aurulenta, gold-fringed mason bee
 Osmia bicolor, two-coloured mason bee
 Osmia caerulescens, blue mason bee
 Osmia inermis, mountain mason bee
 Osmia leaiana, orange-vented mason bee
 Osmia niveata, Jersey mason bee
 Osmia parietina, wall mason bee
 Osmia pilicornis, fringe-horned mason bee
 Osmia bicornis, red mason bee
 Osmia uncinata, pinewood mason bee
 Osmia xanthomelana, large mason bee

Genus Hoplitis: lesser mason bees 
 Hoplitis claviventris, welted lesser mason bee
 Hoplitis leucomelana, black and white lesser mason bee
 Hoplitis spinulosa, spined mason bee syn. Osmia spinulosa

Genus Megachile: leaf-cutter bees 
 Megachile centuncularis, patchwork leaf-cutter bee
 Megachile circumcincta, black-headed leaf-cutter bee
 Megachile dorsalis, silvery leaf-cutter bee
 Megachile lapponica, willowherb leaf-cutter bee
 Megachile ligniseca, wood-carving leaf-cutter bee
 Megachile maritima, coastal leaf-cutter bee
 Megachile versicolor, brown-footed leaf-cutter bee
 Megachile willughbiella, Willughby's leaf-cutter bee

Genus Coelioxys: sharp-tailed bees 
 Coelioxys afra, short sharp-tailed bee
 Coelioxys brevis, narrow-bodied sharp-tailed bee
 Coelioxys conoidea, large sharp-tailed bee
 Coelioxys elongata, dull-vented sharp-tailed bee
 Coelioxys inermis, shiny-vented sharp-tailed bee
 Coelioxys mandibularis, small leaf-cutter cuckoo bee
 Coelioxys quadridentata, four-toothed sharp-tailed bee 
 Coelioxys rufescens, rufescent sharp-tailed bee

Family Apidae

Genus Nomada: nomad bees 
 Nomada alboguttata, large bear-clawed nomad bee
 Nomada argentata, silver-sided nomad bee
 Nomada armata, armed nomad bee
 Nomada baccata, bear-clawed nomad bee
 Nomada bifasciata, dusky-horned nomad bee
 Nomada castellana, Castell's nomad bee
 Nomada conjungens, fringeless nomad bee
 Nomada errans, Purbeck nomad bee
 Nomada fabriciana, Fabricus' nomad bee
 Nomada ferruginata, yellow-shouldered nomad bee
 Nomada flava, flavous yellow nomad bee
 Nomada flavoguttata, small nomad bee
 Nomada flavopicta, blunthorn nomad bee
 Nomada fucata, painted nomad bee
 Nomada fulvicornis, orange-horned nomad bee
 Nomada fuscicornis, small Guernsey nomad bee
 Nomada glabella, bilberry nomad bee
 Nomada goodeniana, Gooden's nomad bee
 Nomada guttulata, short-spined nomad bee
 Nomada hirtipes, long-horned nomad bee
 Nomada integra, catsear nomad bee
 Nomada lathburiana, lathbury's nomad bee
 Nomada leucophthalma, early nomad bee
 Nomada marshamella, Marsham's nomad bee
 Nomada obtusifrons, flat-ridged nomad bee
 Nomada panzeri, Panzer's nomad bee
 Nomada roberjeotiana, tormentil nomad bee
 Nomada ruficornis, fork-jawed nomad bee
 Nomada rufipes, black-horned nomad bee
 Nomada sexfasciata, six-banded nomad bee
 Nomada sheppardana, Sheppard's nomad bee
 Nomada signata, broad-banded nomad bee
 Nomada similis, Guernsey nomad bee
 Nomada striata, blunt-jawed nomad bee
 Nomada subcornuta, Kirby's nomad bee
 Nomada succincta, yellow-legged nomad bee
 Nomada zonata, variable nomad bee

Genus Epeolus: cuckoo mining bees 

 Epeolus cruciger, red thighed cuckoo mining bee
 Epeolus variegatus, variegated cuckoo mining bee

Genus Eucera: long-horned bees 
 Eucera longicornis, long-horned bee
 Eucera nigrescens, early long-horned bee

Genus Anthophora: flower bees 

 Anthophora bimaculata, green-eyed flower bee
 Anthophora furcata, fork-tailed flower bee
 Anthophora plumipes, hairy-footed flower bee
 Anthophora quadrimaculata, four-banded flower bee
 Anthophora retusa, potter flower bee

Genus Melecta: mourning bees 
 Melecta albifrons, mourning bee
 Melecta luctuosa, square-spotted mourning bee

Genus Ceratina: small carpenter bees 
 Ceratina cyanea, blue carpenter bee

Genus Xylocopa: large carpenter bees 
 Xylocopa violacea, violet carpenter bee

Genus Bombus: bumblebees

Subgenus Bombus: white-tailed bumblebees 
 Bombus cryptarum, cryptic bumblebee
 Bombus lucorum, white-tailed bumblebee
 Bombus magnus, northern white-tailed bumblebee
 Bombus terrestris, buff-tailed bumblebee

Subgenus Kallobombus: broken-belted bumblebee 
 Bombus soroeensis, broken-belted bumblebee

Subgenus Megabombus: greater bumblebees 
 Bombus hortorum, garden bumblebee
 Bombus ruderatus, large garden bumblebee

Subgenus Melanobombus: black-bodied bumblebees 
 Bombus lapidarius, red-tailed bumblebee

Subgenus Psithyrus: cuckoo bumblebees 
 Bombus barbutellus, Barbut's cuckoo-bee
 Bombus bohemicus, gypsy cuckoo-bee
 Bombus campestris, field cuckoo-bee
 Bombus rupestris, red-tailed cuckoo-bee
 Bombus sylvestris, forest cuckoo-bee
 Bombus vestalis, vestal cuckoo-bee

Subgenus Pyrobombus: fiery-tailed bumblebees 
 Bombus hypnorum, tree bumblebee
 Bombus jonellus, heath bumblebee
 Bombus monticola, bilberry bumblebee
 Bombus pratorum, early bumblebee

Subgenus Subterraneobombus: yellow bumblebee 
 Bombus distinguendus, great yellow bumblebee

Subgenus Thoracombus: carder bees 
 Bombus humilis, brown-banded carder bee
 Bombus muscorum, moss carder bee
 Bombus pascuorum, common carder bee
 Bombus ruderarius, red-shanked carder bee
 Bombus sylvarum, shrill carder bee

Genus Apis: honeybees 
   Apis mellifera, western honey bee
 Apis mellifera mellifera, European dark bee

References

 Else, George "Section 10 - Check List of British Hymenoptera Aculeata" in Archer, Michael (2005) Bees, Wasps and Ants Recording Society Members' Handbook  (pp. 113–131)
 Baldock, David W. (2008) Bees of Surrey 
 BWARS Bees, Wasps and Ants Recording Society
 Falk, Steven - https://www.flickr.com/photos/63075200@N07/collections/72157631518508520/
 Falk, S. and Lewington, R., 2019. Field Guide to the Bees of Great Britain and Ireland. London: Bloomsbury Publishing Plc.

External links
 BWARS - Bees, Wasps and Ants Recording Society

L
Bees
Bees
Hymenoptera of Europe